Michael Reeves (born November 20, 1997) is an American YouTuber and Twitch streamer who produces “comedy-tech” YouTube videos. He is a member of OfflineTV, an online social entertainment group of content creators.

Early life

Reeves was born to an American father and a Filipino mother. He grew up on the Hawaiian island of Maui. Reeves struggled academically, and directed his energy instead towards teaching himself to code. He briefly attended Northern Arizona University upon graduating high school but dropped out to focus on work, securing a job as a software contractor for the U.S. government.

Career 

While Reeves was attending Northern Arizona University, he released his first video on YouTube, The Robot That Shines a Laser in Your Eye, which went viral. His subsequent videos included a Roomba that swore upon colliding with a wall, a taser camera that shocked its subjects, a Twitter bot that purchased items from the replies that received the most likes, and a modification of Boston Dynamics’s robot dog Spot that urinated beer into a cup on command. In September 2018, Reeves moved from Hawaii to Los Angeles to pursue YouTube full time. Newsweek described Reeves as an "internet edge lord and coding genius."

In December 2019, it was announced that Reeves had joined OfflineTV, a collective of Twitch streamers creating content and living together in Los Angeles, California. In his first video with the group, Reeves created an iteration of laser tag titled "tazer tag" where players get shocked by a taser after being shot.

In June 2020, Reeves began streaming on Twitch, where he streams both video games and technology work. His debut stream attracted over 30,000 concurrent viewers.

With the financial support of a sponsor, OfflineTV purchased the canine-inspired robotic platform Spot from Boston Dynamics in late 2020. It has featured in several videos on both OfflineTV and Reeves' channel.

In May 2022, as part of the charity boxing event "Creator Clash" hosted by iDubbbz, Reeves participated in a boxing match against fellow content creator Graham Stephan. Reeves won the bout by TKO in the second of five rounds.

Personal life 
In September 2018, Reeves moved to Los Angeles and began rooming with fellow comedy-tech YouTuber William Osman. In February 2020, Reeves announced his relationship with fellow OfflineTV member, LilyPichu.

Filmography

Music videos

Accolades

See also 
OfflineTV

References

External links
 

Twitch (service) streamers
American YouTubers
1997 births
Living people
American people of Filipino descent
People from Maui
Technology YouTubers
People from Maui County, Hawaii